This is a list of US places named after non-US places. In the case of this list, place means any named location that's smaller than a county or equivalent: cities, towns, villages, hamlets, neighborhoods, municipalities, boroughs, townships, civil parishes, localities, Census Designated Places, and some districts. Also included are country homes, castles, palaces, and similar institutions. The list below currently comprises around 1000 of these US places but is not exhaustive yet.

There are many places in the United States that are named after places in another country. By far, the majority of the names are due to immigrants naming their new home after their former home. As such they reflect the pattern of immigration to the United States. Immigrants did not just settle in random locations, but rather congregated with others who spoke the same language and had the same religion. Three examples:

 An area in western Michigan centered on Holland in southern Ottawa County was settled by religious refugees from the Netherlands. After a split from the state church in the Netherlands, they were unhappy with the restrictions the Dutch government placed on their religious practices. There are several villages in that region named after villages in the old country.
 A number of Belgian names are found clustered in the Green Bay area of northeastern Wisconsin. This reflects the high concentration of Belgian immigrants in that area.
 Ellis County, Kansas was the destination of a group of Volga Germans who moved there in the 1870s. Their settlements were mostly given the names of the villages they left behind in Russia.

Less concentrated groupings of foreign place names are Norwegian names throughout Minnesota, Czech names in southeast Texas, and Dutch names in the Hudson Valley of New York. The Hudson Valley locations are so named because the area was a Dutch colony before it became an English colony.

But not all the immigrants concentrated so heavily. Germans, for example, are one of the largest immigrant groups and places named after German cities are widespread across the United States. However, there is still a general concentration of them in the Midwestern United States, especially in Missouri.

Other sources of foreign names transferred to the US are the Bible and ancient history. Biblically-sourced names are widespread and are sometimes the result of naming a settlement after its church. Names from ancient history can also be found in a number of places, although a concentration of them can be found in upstate New York. Names from these two sources can be found in the Ancient World section below the list of countries.

Places where battles happened are also a source for foreign names. The Mexican–American War is the most common source, but other wars, such as the Napoleonic Wars and World War I, are also represented.

There is a small number of names whose origin does not fall into the above categories. For example, some were given the names by railroads or taken from books the people naming the town had been reading. A few very unusual sources are Madras, Oregon, which was named after a bolt of Madras cloth seen in the general store, and Poland, Maine, which was named after a medieval-era song that the first settler liked.

Note that not all towns whose names are the same as a foreign city or country are named after that city. For example, there is only one US place that is known to be named for the Boston in England. That is Boston, Massachusetts. The Bostons in Indiana, Missouri, New York, and Highland and Summit Counties in Ohio, as well as Boston Corner, New York and South Boston, Virginia are named after Boston, Massachusetts; those in Georgia and Texas are named after people; while most other places with the name do not have a known etymology. Also note that places named after people are not on this list, even if that person's name can be traced back to a city. For this reason, cities such as New York, Baltimore, New Orleans, and Albuquerque are not on the list. Places named for people can be found at List of places named after people in the United States.

Some places have an indeterminate etymology, where it is known that they are named after a city in a particular country, but there is more than one place with that name and the etymology does not distinguish which one. These entries have "needs disambiguation" in their notes section.

Afghanistan

Albania

Algeria

Angola

Argentina

Australia

Austria

Azerbaijan

Belgium

Bolivia

Brazil

Bulgaria

Burma (Myanmar)

Canada

Chile

China

Colombia

Cuba

Czechia

Denmark

Ecuador

Egypt
For more cities in Egypt, see the Ancient world section below.

Finland

France

Georgia (country)

Germany

Greece
For more cities in Greece, see the Ancient world section below.

Honduras

Hungary

Iceland

India

Iran
For cities in Iran, see the Ancient world section below.

Iraq
For more cities in Iraq, see the Ancient world section below.

Ireland

Israel 
For cities in Israel, see the Ancient world section below.

Italy
For more cities in Italy, see the Ancient world section below.

Japan

Jordan
For cities in Jordan, see the Ancient world section below.

Latvia

Lebanon
For more cities in Lebanon, see the Ancient world section below.

Lebanon, Connecticut, Lebanon, Indiana, Lebanon, Oregon, and Lebanon, Missouri are named after the country itself.

Libya

Lithuania

Mali

Mexico

Morocco

The Netherlands

Norway

Pakistan

Palestine
For cities in Palestinian territory, see the Ancient world section below.

Panama

Peru

Philippines

Poland

Portugal

Romania

Russia

Saudi Arabia

Serbia

Singapore

Slovakia

Slovenia

South Africa

Spain

Sudan

Sweden

Switzerland

Syria
For cities in Syria, see the Ancient world section below.

Tunisia
For cities in Tunisia, see the Ancient world section below.

Turkey
For more cities in Turkey, see the Ancient world section below.

Ukraine

United Kingdom

British Overseas Territories

Crown Dependencies

England

Northern Ireland

Scotland

Wales

Uruguay

Uzbekistan

Ancient world
Cities that have namesakes because they are biblical or prominent in ancient history are in this section.

See also

 List of places named after people in the United States
 List of places named after places in the United States
 Lists of places by language of origin
 List of place names of Czech origin in the United States
 List of place names of Dutch origin in the United States
 Locations in the United States with an English name
 List of place names of French origin in the United States
 List of Irish place names in other countries
 List of place names of Scottish origin in the United States
 List of place names of Spanish origin in the United States
 List of Swedish place names in the United States
 List of place names of Welsh origin in the United States

References

US places
City
US places
USA